The BC Cancer Research Centre (also known as the BCCRC, BC Cancer Agency Research Centre, or BCCA Cancer Research Centre) is located in Vancouver, British Columbia, Canada. Scientists and researchers perform basic, epidemiological, and clinical research on cancer prevention, early diagnosis of cancer, the molecular and genetic characteristics of the cancer process, and basic research related to new treatments for cancer. With direct links to the cancer centres across the province, discoveries at the Research Centre are quickly translated into clinical applications.

In 2005 the Canada Green Building Council certified the building had met LEED (Leadership in Energy and Environmental Design) Gold standards for its sustainable design, making it the first health-care facility in Canada to attain that distinction.

Michael Smith Genome Sciences Centre
The Michael Smith Genome Sciences Centre, named for Nobel laureate Michael Smith, is located in the BC Cancer Research Centre.

See also

BC Cancer Agency
BC Cancer Foundation
Provincial Health Services Authority

References

Medical and health organizations based in British Columbia
Medical research institutes in Canada
Leadership in Energy and Environmental Design gold certified buildings
Leadership in Energy and Environmental Design certified buildings in Canada